Derrick Carter is a Guyana footballer who currently plays for Fruta Conquerors in the Guyana National Football League and the Guyana national team.

References

Living people
Guyanese footballers
1982 births
Sportspeople from Georgetown, Guyana
Association football goalkeepers
Fruta Conquerors FC players
Georgetown FC players
Western Tigers FC players
Guyana international footballers